Tiago Guedes (born 20 June 1971) is a Portuguese film director and editor.  Guedes' film credits include Entre os Dedos,  Blood Curse and Acordar.  His television credits include The Domain, Odisseia and Os Boys.

Guedes is a frequent collaborator with director Frederico Serra.  He was born in Porto and is married to actress Isabel Abreu.

References

External links 

 	

1971 births
People from Porto
Living people
Portuguese film directors
Sophia Award winners